The Clemson University International Center for Automotive Research (CU-ICAR) is a  automotive and motorsports research campus in Greenville, South Carolina. The facility includes a graduate school offering Master's and Doctoral degrees in automotive engineering, and offering programs focused on systems integration. CU-ICAR's mission is to be a high seminary of learning, in the field of automotive engineering, lead translational research, with emphasis on industry relevance, and support with excellence in basic research, contribute to high-value job creation in South Carolina and lead global thinking on the sustainable development of the automotive sector.

Ozen Engineering Incorporated announced plans to base its East Coast operations at CU-ICAR.

External links
 CU-ICAR Official Website
 Clemson University Department of Automotive Engineering Website

References

Clemson University
Education in Greenville, South Carolina
Buildings and structures in Greenville, South Carolina